This list of tallest buildings in Baltimore ranks skyscrapers and high-rises in the United States city of Baltimore by height. The tallest building in Baltimore is the 40-story Transamerica Tower, which rises  and was completed in 1973. It also stands as the tallest building in the State of Maryland.



History
The history of skyscrapers in Baltimore began with the completion in 1889 of the Equitable Building at the southwest corner of North Calvert and East Fayette Streets across from the Beaux Arts/Classical Revival architecture of the Baltimore City Courthouse of 1894–1900 and the landmark Battle Monument in Battle Monument Square, commemorating the fallen in the defense of the City against the British attack in the 1814 Battle of Baltimore during the War of 1812. "The Equitable" as it became known replaced the earlier landmark from 1825, Barnum's City Hotel and was the first steel cage framed building with outside surface panels of stone hung on the frame, a new technique pioneered by Chicago architects like Louis Sullivan and Daniel Burnham.

Shortly after, the 1893 construction of the Fidelity Building, of which both are regarded as the first high-rises in the city.

Baltimore went through an early high-rise construction boom from the late 1890s to the Great Baltimore Fire of February 1904, when a half-dozen of new skyscrapers' so-called "fire-proof" but their interiors were burned out. Most were later judged by inspecting engineers/architects as structurally sound with their steel I-beam cage framing and masonry facades and were reconstructed and rehabilitated in the next five years in a flurry of downtown rebuilding. The next period from the 1910s to the late 1920s, during which time the Baltimore Trust Company Tower (now the Bank of America Building) were constructed.

The city's central business district then experienced a long fallow period due to the Great Depression of the 1930s and the defense industrial efforts of World War II where very few skyscrapers were constructed and the downtown remained relatively stable. But with the proposals by the major business, commercial and industrial interests of the area with the release of the Charles Center project proposal by the recently organized Greater Baltimore Committee and the local Chamber of Commerce with the leadership of several mayoral administrations in 1958 continuing into the early 1970s, followed by a parallel soon-to-be nationally famous "Inner Harbor" redevelopment around the old waterfront piers, wharves, warehouses, offices and businesses of the former "Basin" along the Baltimore Harbor at the Northwest Branch of the Patapsco River continued another major building boom from the early 1960s to the early 1990s, during which the City saw the completion of 18 of its 24 tallest buildings, including the 1973 United States Fidelity and Guarantee Company's new headquarters (later the Legg Mason Building, now the Transamerica Tower) at the corner of the harbor at Pratt and Light Streets and the five-sides/pentagonal high-rise centerpiece of the harbor, the Baltimore World Trade Center for the Maryland Port Administration in 1977.

As of June 2008, there are 163 completed high-rises in the city. The most recently completed skyscraper in Baltimore is 414 Water Street, which rises  and 33 floors. The 44-story 414 Light Street apartment tower debuted in August 2018, making it the tallest residential building in Maryland.

Tallest buildings
This includes spires and architectural details but does not include antenna masts. An equal sign (=) following a rank indicates the same height between two or more buildings. The "Year" column indicates the year in which a building was completed.

Tallest under construction or proposed
This lists buildings that are under construction or proposed for construction in Baltimore and are planned to rise at least , but are not yet completed structures. A floor count of 40 stories is used as the cutoff for buildings whose heights have not yet been released by their developers.

Timeline of tallest buildings
This lists buildings that once held the title of tallest building in Baltimore.

Notes
A. ^ The Constellation Energy Building, completed in 1916, tied the height of the Emerson Bromo-Seltzer Tower. The city therefore had two tallest buildings until the B&O Railroad Grain Terminal was completed in 1923.
B. This building was constructed as the B&O Railroad Grain Terminal but has since been renamed Silo Point.
C. This building was constructed as the Baltimore Trust Company Building but has since been renamed the Bank of America Building. In the past, the building has also known as the NationsBank Building, the Mathieson Building, the O'Sullivan Building and the Maryland National Bank.

References

Sources

External links
 Diagram of Baltimore skyscrapers on SkyscraperPage

 
Baltimore
Baltimore-related lists
Tallest in Baltimore